John Bethell (c. 1804–1867) was a British solicitor and inventor. In 1838, he patented the 'Bethell process' for preserving timber using creosote. That same year he was elected an Associate of the Institution of Civil Engineers. He was the younger brother of Richard, the Lord Chancellor Lord Westbury and like his brother a son-in-law of the architect Robert Abraham,  having married Abraham's daughter Louisa Sarah on 28 February 1833.

References

British inventors
1800s births
1867 deaths

Year of birth uncertain